Sir James John Digges La Touche  (December 1844 - 5 October 1921) was an Irish civil servant in British India, where he spent most of his career in the North-Western Provinces.

Career in India
La Touche was born in Dublin, the son of Mr. W. Digges La Touche. He joined the Indian Civil Service in 1867, and spent four years in Ajmir Province and four years in Upper Burma, before moving to the North-Western Provinces. In that province he served as a member of the Board of Revenue and Chief Secretary, and in 1897 acted as Lieutenant-Governor for six months, after the breakdown in health of Sir Anthony MacDonnell following the combat with the famine that year.

He was a Member of the Council of the Viceroy of India, and was in November 1901 appointed Lieutenant-Governor of the North-Western Provinces and Chief Commissioner of Oudh. In March 1902 the province was renamed the United Provinces of Agra and Oudh, and the former commissionership was abolished. La Touche continued as Lieutenant-Governor of the United Provinces of Agra and Oudh until December 1906.
The following year he was appointed a Member of the Council of the Secretary of State for India.

La Touche was appointed a Companion of the Order of the Star of India (CSI) in the 1896 New Year Honours list on 1 January 1896, and promoted to a Knight Commander (KCSI) in the 1901 Birthday Honours list on 9 November 1901.

Latouche Road in Kanpur is named in his honour.
Latouche Road in Lucknow is named in his honour.

Family
La Touche married, in Bombay in 1873, Julia Mary Rothwell, daughter of Thomas W. Rothwell.

References

1844 births
1921 deaths
Indian Civil Service (British India) officers
Knights Commander of the Order of the Star of India